Terry Van Akkeren (born March 10, 1954) is an American politician, engineering technician, and die and tool maker.

Career
Van Akkeren graduated from Sheboygan North High School and went to Lakeshore Technical College. He worked as an engineering technician and tool and die maker. He also served on the Sheboygan County Board of Supervisors.

Elections
From 2002 until 2010, Van Akkeren served in the Wisconsin State Assembly, as a Democrat, representing the 26th Assembly District. On November 2, 2010, Van Akkeren was defeated for election by Mike Endsley.

Van Akkeren unsuccessfully ran for Mayor of Sheboygan in 2009. He lost to Alderman Bob Ryan 3,968 votes to 5,891. He ran again in 2012 when a special recall election was called.

On February 21, 2012, Van Akkeren defeated Mayor Bob Ryan in the mayoral recall election. On March 5, 2012, Van Akkeren was sworn in as Mayor of Sheboygan. After serving the remaining months of former Mayor Ryan's four-year term, Van Akkeren lost his reelection bid to Sheboygan County Supervisor Mike Vandersteen by a vote of 4,059 to 3,862. On November 4, 2014, Terry Katsma defeated Van Akkeren for the Wisconsin State Assembly seat.

References

External links
 
 Terry Van Akkeren at Ballotpedia
 

County supervisors in Wisconsin
Mayors of Sheboygan, Wisconsin
Democratic Party members of the Wisconsin State Assembly
1954 births
Living people
21st-century American politicians